Johann Sebastian Bach's Clavier-Übung II was published in 1735, containing two works written for performance on a two-manual harpsichord. In the publication, Bach contrasted a work in Italian style – a Concerto nach Italienischem Gusto (Concerto after the Italian taste, now known as the Italian Concerto), BWV 971, with a work in French style, a suite which he called Ouvertüre nach franzosischer Art (Overture in the French style, also known as the French Overture), BWV 831.

History
The French Overture had previously been written down in C minor; for the publication of 1735 Bach transposed it to B minor and made slight changes to the musical text, for example in the rhythms of the first movement. The reason for the transposition is not known: one speculation is that the aim was to increase the contrast between the two works. F major is a "flat" key and B minor is a "sharp" key, and the keynotes are related by a tritone, which is the most distant modulation. Another possible motivation is that out of the eight German note names A, B (B), C, D, E, F, G, H (B), six had already been used as keynotes in the Partitas, thus only F and H remained.

The keys of the Partitas (B-flat major, C minor, A minor, D major, G major, E minor) may seem like an irregular sequence, but in fact they form a sequence of intervals going up and then down by increasing amounts: a second up (B-flat to C), a third down (C to A), a fourth up (A to D), a fifth down (D to G), and finally a sixth up (G to E).  The sequence continues into Clavier-Übung II with the Italian Concerto, a seventh down (E to F), and the French Ouverture, an augmented fourth up (F to B-natural).  Thus the sequence of customary tonalities for 18th-century keyboard compositions is complete, extending from the first letter of his name (Bach's "home" key, B,  in German is B) to the last letter of his name (B in German is H).

Italian Concerto, BWV 971

French Overture, BWV 831

Reception

References

Compositions by Johann Sebastian Bach
1735 compositions
Compositions for harpsichord